Friedrich-Gundolf-Preis is a literary prize of Germany. It was established by the Deutsche Akademie für Sprache und Dichtung in 1964 to promote German culture outwith Germany. The award is named after the Germanist Friedrich Gundolf. The award is endowed with €15,000.

Award winners 

1964 Robert Minder
1965 Frederick Norman
1966 Victor Lange
1967 Eudo C. Mason
1968 Oskar Seidlin
1969 Eduard Goldstücker
1970 Erik Lunding
1971 Zoran Konstantinovi
1972 Ladislao Mittner
1973 Gustav Korlén
1974 Herman Meyer
1975 Elizabeth M. Wilkinson
1976 Marian Szyrocki
1977 Franz H. Mautner
1978 Claude David
1979 Zdenko Skreb
1980 Lev Kopelev
1981 Leonard Forster
1982 Tomio Tezuka
1983 Jean Fourquet
1984 Stuart Atkins
1985 Mazzino Montinari
1986 Siegbert S. Prawer
1987 Viktor Žmegač
1988 Feng Zhi
1989 Leslie Bodi
1990 Konstantin Asadowski
1991 Giorgio Strehler
1992 Emil Skala
1993 Patrice Chéreau
1994 Helen Wolff
1995 Philippe Lacoue-Labarthe
1996 Volkmar Sander
1997 Imre Kertész
1998 Shulamit Volkov
1999 Thomas von Vegesack
2000 Ryszard Krynicki
2001 Fuad Rifka
2002 Massimo Cacciari
2003 Per Øhrgaard
2004 Isidor Levin
2005 László F. Földényi
2006 Kim Kwang-Kyu
2007 Nora Iuga
2008 Jurko Prochasko
2009 Nicholas Boyle
2010 Şara Sayın
2011 Feliu Formosa
2012 Bernard Lortholary
2013 Mati Sirkel
2014 Drinka Gojković
2015 Neil MacGregor
2016 Hubert Orłowski
2017 László Márton
2018 Miguel Sáenz
2019 Paul Michael Lützeler
2020 Tatiana Baskakova
2021 Khalid Al-Maaly
2022 Alison Lewis

References

External links
 

German literary awards
Awards established in 1964
1964 establishments in Germany